MacNider Art Museum, officially the Charles H. MacNider Art Museum, is an art museum conceived in 1964 and opened to the public in 1966 in Mason City, Iowa. It is housed in a former convent. The museum is known for its collection of American art, and includes paintings, prints, drawings, ceramics, sculpture, fused and blown glass and textiles. There is a special collection of Bil Baird marionettes, hand puppets and ephemera, including those used for "The Lonely Goatherd" scene in the film The Sound of Music.

It is named after Charles H. MacNider (b. 1860), president of the First National Bank of Mason City and father of General Hanford MacNider.

References

External links
MacNider Art Museum

Art museums established in 1966
Art museums and galleries in Iowa
Institutions accredited by the American Alliance of Museums
Buildings and structures in Mason City, Iowa
1966 establishments in Iowa
Museums in Cerro Gordo County, Iowa
Museums of American art